Sir Claude Ernest Weymouth James (24 February 1878 – 27 August 1961) was an Australian politician.

He was born in Launceston. In 1925 he was elected to the Tasmanian House of Assembly seat of Bass, initially as a member of Walter Lee's "Liberal" grouping. By 1928 he had joined the Nationalist Party. He served a period as a minister. In 1937 he retired from the House, becoming Tasmania's Agent-General in London, a position he held until 1950. He was knighted in 1941, and died in Launceston.

References

1878 births
1961 deaths
Nationalist Party of Australia members of the Parliament of Tasmania
Members of the Tasmanian House of Assembly
Australian Knights Bachelor